Foothill High School (FHS) is a public high school in Pleasanton, California, United States. It was established in 1973 and is part of the Pleasanton Unified School District. It is a fully accredited WASC school, with its six-year WASC accreditation approved in the 2018–2019 school year. It was recognized as a California Distinguished School in 1994, 2001, 2005 and 2019. It was a 2002 nominee, and a 2006 winner of the National Blue Ribbon Award. In the US News school rankings for 2020, it was ranked #415 in the National Rankings and #52 in the California High School rankings.

Notable alumni
Valerie Arioto, player with the United States women's national softball team
Brad Bergesen, former pitcher for the MLB
Brandon Crawford, infielder for three-time World Series champion San Francisco Giants
Paula Creamer, professional golfer on LPGA Tour
Todd Fischer, professional golfer on PGA Tour
T. J. Friedl, baseball player
Sean Mannion, starting quarterback for Oregon State, currently with Minnesota Vikings
Keith Millard, former NFL defensive tackle and defensive line coach for Tampa Bay Buccaneers
Eric Moran, former NFL player
Rich Moran, former NFL player
Bob Otto, former NFL player
Jason Tarver, football coach
Gabrielle Union, actress and model
Rob Williams, host of The Rob, Anybody, and Dawn Show in Sacramento
Brett de Geus, MLB pitcher

References

External links

Pleasanton Unified School District
High schools in Alameda County, California
Education in Pleasanton, California
Public high schools in California
Educational institutions established in 1973
1973 establishments in California